Field Notes from a Catastrophe: Man, Nature, and Climate Change is a 2006 non-fiction book by Elizabeth Kolbert. The book documents a series of scientific observations and political processes, bringing attention to the causes and effects of global climate change. Kolbert travels around the world where climate change is affecting the environment in significant ways. These locations include Alaska, Greenland, the Netherlands, and Iceland.  The environmental effects that are apparent consist of rising sea levels, thawing permafrost, diminishing ice shelves, changes in migratory patterns, and increasingly devastating forest fires due to loss of precipitation. She also speaks with many leading scientists about their individual research and findings. Kolbert brings to attention the attempts of large corporations such as Exxon Mobil and General Motors to influence politicians and discredit scientists. She also writes about America’s reluctance in the global efforts to reduce carbon emissions. Leading this resistance, she explained, was the Bush administration, which was opposed to the Kyoto Protocol since it was ratified in 2005. Kolbert concludes the book by examining the events surrounding the events of Hurricane Katrina in 2005 and arguing that governments have the knowledge and technologies to prepare for such disasters but choose to ignore the signs until it is too late.

See also
The Sixth Extinction: An Unnatural History
Business action on climate change
Climate change in the Arctic
Effects of global warming
ExxonMobil climate change controversy
Politicization of science

References

External links 

 

Environmental non-fiction books
2006 non-fiction books
2006 in the environment
Climate change and the environment
Climate change assessment and attribution
Climate change books